Marius Wilson is a Saint Lucian politician. He represented the Micoud North constituency as an Independent member of parliament until December 2006.

He first ran for the constituency under the St. Lucia Labour Party. While he lost at that time, he won in the 2001 general elections. Wilson was not a candidate for the 2006 general elections. He was a former student of St.Mary's  college Secondary school.

References

Members of the House of Assembly of Saint Lucia
Living people
Saint Lucia Labour Party politicians
Year of birth missing (living people)